Wesley Biblical Seminary is Christian seminary in the Methodist (Wesleyan-Arminian) tradition that is located in Ridgeland, Mississippi. It was founded in 1974 and serves men and women who come from thirty denominations from all across the United States and other countries. WBS has its main residential campus in Jackson and a virtual campus made up of students from around the globe.

It is an approved seminary of the Global Methodist Church.

History
The founding of Wesley Biblical Seminary grew out of the need for adequately prepared pastors within the Methodist tradition in the Deep South. In 1974, under the leadership of Ivan C. Howard, the founding president, a group of interested persons representing historic Methodism participated in the establishment of a theological seminary committed to graduate-level educational ministry in the Deep South. On July 22, 1975, Wesley Biblical Seminary was incorporated as an independent, non-profit educational institution with its charter, bylaws, and statement of faith duly adopted at the first Board of Trustees meeting on September 20, 1975.

The seminary is governed by a Board of Trustees composed of ministerial and lay leaders who represent the rich diversity of the Holiness tradition. The diversity of the board reflects that of the student body in being composed of both men and women and being interracial, international, and interdenominational in background. The seminary depends primarily upon gifts and pledges of concerned individuals, groups, and local churches for operational, capital and endowment funding.

Academics
The seminary offers the Master of Divinity, Master of Arts, and Doctor of Ministry degrees. WBS will be offering undergrad programming in Fall 2021. All graduate and post graduate degrees at WBS are available online and are accredited by the Association of Theological Schools in the United States and Canada (ATS).

Media
The Hour of Holiness is a national 30-minute radio program sponsored by Wesley Biblical Seminary and features Dr. William Ury, Adjunct Professor of Systematic Theology. The broadcast can be heard Sunday mornings at 9:30 on American Family Radio.

Denominations 
Wesley Biblical Seminary is an approved seminary of the Global Methodist Church.

Wesley Biblical Seminary is attended by many of those seeking higher education for ministry in Methodist denominations of the conservative holiness movement, such as the Evangelical Methodist Church Conference.

References

External links
 Official website

Seminaries and theological colleges in Mississippi
Educational institutions established in 1974
Methodism in Mississippi
Methodist universities and colleges in the United States
Education in Jackson, Mississippi
Buildings and structures in Jackson, Mississippi
Interdenominational seminaries and theological colleges
1974 establishments in Mississippi